Senator Dowd may refer to:

David W. Dowd (1921–1975), New Jersey State Senate
Wayne Dowd (1941–2016), Arkansas State Senate